Karel Kopp (25 October 1903 – 11 August 1956) was a Czech architect. His work was part of the architecture event in the art competition at the 1932 Summer Olympics.

References

1903 births
1956 deaths
20th-century Czech architects
Olympic competitors in art competitions
Architects from Prague